Lakeville is a census-designated place (CDP) in Litchfield County, Connecticut, United States, close to Dutchess County, New York. It is within the town of Salisbury, but has its own ZIP Code (06039). As of the 2010 census, the population of Lakeville was 928, out of 3,741 in the entire town of Salisbury. The Hotchkiss School is located in Lakeville, and the Indian Mountain School is nearby.

Geography
US 44 leads northeast  to Canaan village and west  to Millerton, New York.

Most of the water area is part of Lake Wononscopomuc, the deepest natural lake in the state.

History
Until 1846, Lakeville was called "Furnace Village", due to the location there of one of the early blast furnaces of the historic Salisbury iron industry (one of which was established in the 1760s by future Revolutionary War hero Ethan Allen. Benjamin B. Hotchkiss, inventor of the Hotchkiss gun was born in nearby Watertown. A boarding school in his name, the Hotchkiss School, was founded by his widow Maria Bissell Hotchkiss in Lakeville in 1891. It later became coeducational. The Indian Mountain School, a boarding school for students Pre-K through 9th, is south of the Lakeville CDP. It was founded in 1922.

Lakeville was the original home to what would eventually relocate and become the Mansfield Training School, an institution for mentally challenged  residents of Connecticut from 1860 to 1993.

Other notable events
Lakeville is the site of Connecticut's oldest cold case. Camp Sloane camper Connie Smith left the camp on Indian Mountain Road on the morning of July 16, 1952. She was ten years old and was from Sundance, Wyoming; she was the granddaughter of former Wyoming Governor Nels H. Smith. Several people observed her walking and hitchhiking toward the center of Lakeville. She was last seen walking along Route 44 near the intersection of Belgo Road. Her disappearance sparked one of the largest searches ever conducted by the Connecticut State Police. Despite a nationwide search, she was never found, and foul play is suspected. Her case remains open and still has a detective assigned to it.

Local institutions

New England's oldest Methodist congregation is in Lakeville.

YMCA Camp Sloane is located in Connecticut, between Indian Mountain Road and Lake Wononpakook, and has operated there since 1928.

Notable people
 Jill Clayburgh, actress
 Wanda Landowska, musician
 Wassily Leontief, Nobel Economics laureate
 William A. Prendergast (1867–1954), businessman and politician 
 Artie Shaw, bandleader
 Georges Simenon, author. The town forms the background for his novel La Mort de Belle (The Death of Belle), later adapted to film as The End of Belle
 Rip Torn, actor
 MacKenzie Scott, philanthropist
 Lily Rabe, actress

See also

References

External links

Salisbury, Connecticut
Villages in Litchfield County, Connecticut
Census-designated places in Connecticut